Pennbrook station is a station along the SEPTA Lansdale/Doylestown Line, north of Philadelphia, Pennsylvania, United States.  In FY 2013, Pennbrook station had a weekday average of 467 boardings and 371 alightings.

The station is located at Church Road and Cherry Street in the Pennbrook section of the borough of Lansdale and features a 222 space parking lot. Most of these parking spaces are located on the east side of Church Road and are on Borough of Lansdale property.  The lots on the west side of Church Road are on SEPTA property.  Overnight parking is allowed by prior arrangement on the SEPTA lots. It is not allowed on the Lansdale lots.  This station consists of two acrylic glass shelters on both platforms.

Station layout
Pennbrook has two low-level side platforms with a mini high-level platform.

References

External links
SEPTA - Pennbrook Station
December 28, 2001 Bob Vogel photo (NYC Subways.org)
 Station from Church Road from Google Maps Street View

SEPTA Regional Rail stations
Railway stations in Montgomery County, Pennsylvania
Stations on the SEPTA Main Line